4,4′-Azobis(4-cyanopentanoic acid) (ACPA) is a free radical initiator used in polymer synthesis. ACPA is a water-soluble initiator used in both heterogeneous and homogeneous free-radical polymerizations. It is used as an initiator in reversible addition−fragmentation chain transfer polymerization (RAFT). When heated to decomposition, c. 70 °C, it releases N2 and produces 2 equivalents of reactive radicals capable of initiating polymerization.

References 

Azo compounds
Nitriles
Dicarboxylic acids
Radical initiators